The 22nd Canadian ministry was the second cabinet chaired by Prime Minister Pierre Trudeau.  It governed Canada from 3 March 1980 to 30 June 1984, including most of the 32nd Canadian Parliament.  The government was formed by the Liberal Party of Canada.  Trudeau was also Prime Minister in the 20th Canadian ministry (1968–1979).

Ministers

References

Succession

22
Ministries of Elizabeth II
1980 establishments in Canada
1984 disestablishments in Canada
Cabinets established in 1980
Cabinets disestablished in 1984